Neagu River may refer to:

 Neagu, a tributary of the Sebeș in Alba County, Romania
 Neagu, a tributary of the Valea Mare in Alba County, Romania

See also 
 Neagu (disambiguation)
 Negoiu River (disambiguation)